Anillinus is a genus of ground beetles in the family Carabidae. There are at least 50 described species in Anillinus.

Species

References

Further reading

 
 
 
 
 
 

Trechinae